Ray Lui Leung-wai (born 22 December 1956) is a Hong Kong actor. Born in Chợ Lớn, Saigon, Vietnam, he traces his ancestry to Lianjiang, Guangdong. He is best known for his role as "Ting Lik" in the 1980 Hong Kong television series The Bund produced by TVB, which propelled him to fame. Since then, Lui has acted in several films and other television series also produced by TVB.

Early life and career
Lui was born in a Hoa family in Chợ Lớn, Saigon, South Vietnam in 1956. His father, a businessman, moved from China to Vietnam in the 1940s. In 1967, during the Vietnam War, Lui moved to Hong Kong with his family and was encouraged by his father to join an actors' training class. He enrolled in TVB's Artists Training Class in the 1970s and began acting as extras or minor characters in various television series produced by the television network. In 1980, Lui rose to fame after playing "Ting Lik" in the period television series The Bund, co-starring with Chow Yun-fat and Angie Chiu. He continued to portray "Ting Lik" in the two sequels to The Bund (The Bund II and The Bund III). Since then, Lui has been playing the leading roles of various TVB-produced television series in the 1980s. Lui retired from TVB in 1989 and went to work on films and mainland Chinese television series. He returned to TVB in 2009, starring as "Marcus Cheuk" in the television drama Born Rich.

Filmography

Film

Television

References

External links
The Bund

Ray Lui at the Hong Kong Movie DataBase

1956 births
Hong Kong Buddhists
Hong Kong people of Hoa descent
Vietnamese emigrants to Hong Kong

Hong Kong male actors
TVB actors
Living people